Devils was Xmal Deutschland's fourth and final album, released in 1989. "Devils" was recorded at Hammertone studio, Düsseldorf and Pilot studios, Munich by Henry Staroste. Mixed at Chateau du Pape, Hamburg by Paul Corkett.

Track listing
 "I'll Be Near You" – 3:38
 "Searchlights" – 4:20
 "You Broke My Heart" – 4:28
 "Sleepwalker" – 3:50
 "When Devils Come" – 3:58
 "Heavens and Seas" – 3:51
 "Dreamhouse" – 3:38
 "I Push It Harder" – 3:50
 "I Should Have Known" – 4:06
 "All in My Hand" – 4:12
 "Drowned You" – 2:58
 "Dreamhouse Theme" – 3:25

Personnel
 Anja Huwe - vocal
 Frank Ziegert - guitar
 Wesley Plass - guitar
 Henry Staroste - keyboards
 Wolfgang Ellerbrock - bass
 Curt Cress - drums

Xmal Deutschland albums
1989 albums